Sega Arcade Gallery is a compilation of four Sega arcade games ported to the Game Boy Advance. It was released in North America on May 22, 2003 and in Europe on August 1, 2003.

Games Included
 After Burner
 Out Run
 Space Harrier
 Super Hang-On

References

2003 video games
Game Boy Advance games
Game Boy Advance-only games
Video games developed in the United Kingdom
Sega video game compilations
THQ games
Bits Studios games
Single-player video games